This award was named in memory of the blacklisted prominent actor and Actors' Equity Association worker Philip Loeb, who committed suicide in 1955 after losing his craft to McCarthyism. The award honors an Equity member "who has performed a unique and outstanding service on behalf of his or her fellow members and whose quality of service, ideas and contribution has set him or her apart from others; someone who truly perpetuates the legacy inherited from Philip Loeb."

Recipients 
 William Ross
 Iggie Wolfington
 Florida Friebus
 Edith Meiser

References 

Actors' Equity Association
American theater awards
Humanitarian and service awards